was son of famous samurai Minamoto no Yoshiie and an ancestor of the Ashikaga and Nitta clans. Yoshikuni was the samurai who first implored the spirit of the Iwashimizu Shrine to start living in this bamboo grove and he built the shrine in honor of the god Hachiman. His childhood name was Kugenmaru (普賢丸). He became a monk in 1154, dying two years later.

Family
 Father: Minamoto no Yoshiie
 Mother: Daughter of Fujiwara no Aritsuna (藤原有綱の娘)
 Children:
 Minamoto no Yoshishige 
 Minamoto no Yoshiyasu

External links
Pictures of the Iwashimizu Hachimangu Shrine of Minamoto no Yoshikuni
A Medieval Samurai Domicile The Hikobe Family Manor

1082 births
1155 deaths
People of Heian-period Japan
Heian period Buddhist clergy